UFC 92: The Ultimate 2008 was a mixed martial arts (MMA) pay-per-view event held by the Ultimate Fighting Championship (UFC) on December 27, 2008 at the MGM Grand Garden Arena in Las Vegas, Nevada.

Background
The main event featured UFC Light Heavyweight Champion Forrest Griffin, against undefeated challenger Rashad Evans. This was the first time that two winners of The Ultimate Fighter competed in a title fight against each other.

The first co-main event saw former UFC Heavyweight Champion Frank Mir against former Pride Heavyweight Champion and Interim UFC Heavyweight Champion Antônio Rodrigo Nogueira.

The other co-main event was a rubber match between former UFC Light Heavyweight Champion Quinton Jackson and former PRIDE Middleweight champion Wanderlei Silva.  Silva had won their previous two matches in the PRIDE organization in Japan.

Antoni Hardonk was originally scheduled to face Mark Burch, who was injured and replaced by Mike Wessel.

Results

Bonus awards
Fighters were awarded $60,000 bonuses.

Fight of the Night: Rashad Evans vs. Forrest Griffin
Knockout of the Night: Quinton Jackson
Submission of the Night: Not awarded as no matches ended with submission

Reported payout
Rashad Evans: $130,000 (includes $65,000 win bonus)
def. Forrest Griffin: $100,000
Frank Mir: $90,000 (includes $45,000 win bonus)
def. Antônio Rodrigo Nogueira: $250,000
Quinton Jackson: $325,000 (includes $100,000 win bonus)
def. Wanderlei Silva: $200,000
C.B. Dollaway: $20,000 (includes $10,000 win bonus)
def. Mike Massenzio: $5,000
Cheick Kongo: $90,000 (includes $45,000 win bonus)
def: Mostapha al-Turk: $7,000
Yushin Okami: $32,000 (includes $16,000 win bonus)
def. Dean Lister: $19,000
Antoni Hardonk: $28,000 (includes $14,000 win bonus)
def. Mike Wessel: $4,000
Matt Hamill: $20,000 (includes $10,000 win bonus)
def. Reese Andy: $15,000
Brad Blackburn: $14,000 (includes $7,000 win bonus)
vs. Ryo Chonan: $18,000
Pat Barry: $10,000 (includes $5,000 win bonus)
Dan Evensen: $4,000

References

See also
 Ultimate Fighting Championship
 List of UFC champions
 List of UFC events
 2008 in UFC

Ultimate Fighting Championship events
2008 in mixed martial arts
Mixed martial arts in Las Vegas
2008 in sports in Nevada
MGM Grand Garden Arena